Finland was present at the Eurovision Song Contest 1987, held in Brussels, Belgium.

Before Eurovision

National final 
The Finnish national final to select their entry was held on 21 February 1987 at the Yle's Studios in Helsinki. Hosting the final were two previous Finnish Eurovision entrants, Laila Halme and Lasse Mårtenson. For the first time in three years, a national postcard poll decided the winner. The winning entry was "Sata salamaa", performed by Virve Rosti and composed by Petri Laaksonen and Veli-Pekka Lehto.

At Eurovision
Rosti performed eighteenth on the night of the contest, following Cyprus and preceding Denmark. While at Brussels, she was credited as "Vicky Rosti" and performed with the band Boulevard, neither of which she did at the national final. At the close of the voting it had received 32 points, placing 15th in a record-setting field of 22 competing countries.

Voting

References

External links
Finnish National Final 1987

1987
Countries in the Eurovision Song Contest 1987
Eurovision